A Year Toward Tomorrow is a 1966 American short documentary film about the Volunteers in Service to America, directed by Edmond Levy. In 1967, it won an Oscar for Documentary Short Subject at the 39th Academy Awards.

Cast
 Paul Newman as Narrator

References

External links
 
Watch A Year Toward Tomorrow on YouTube, posted by the Lyndon Baines Johnson Library and Museum
A Year Toward Tomorrow at the National Archives and Records Administration

1966 films
1966 documentary films
1966 independent films
1966 short films
American short documentary films
American independent films
1960s English-language films
Best Documentary Short Subject Academy Award winners
Documentary films about poverty in the United States
Volunteers in Service to America
1960s short documentary films
1960s American films